John Aloisi (born 5 February 1976) is an Australian former soccer player and current head coach of A-League club Western United. In a professional career that spanned 20 seasons, with league totals of 459 games and 127 goals, he was the first Australian ever to play and score in La Liga, the Premier League and Serie A.

He returned to Australia in 2007, with four seasons in the A-League. Aloisi was an integral member of the Australia national team for more than a decade, and represented the nation at the 2006 World Cup, being an essential figure in the qualifying stages. He also appeared for the Socceroos in two Confederations Cups. A former striker, Aloisi was described as a goal poacher who was able to "hold the ball up well and create opportunities for his teammates."

Club career

Early years and England
Born in Adelaide, South Australia, Aloisi arrived in Europe aged 16, signing with Standard Liège from Adelaide City. He did not appear in any official games for the club, and also played sparingly for his next team, fellow top division outfit Royal Antwerp F.C..

In November 1995, Aloisi signed for Italian side US Cremonese. On the 25th, after only two minutes on the pitch, he scored in a 2–1 home win against Calcio Padova, becoming the youngest foreign player ever to score in a Serie A match. Ultimately, the Lombardy team suffered two consecutive relegations, and he left the club.

Aloisi arrived in English football early in the 1997–98 season, signing for Portsmouth in the Division One, under the chairmanship of Australia national football team manager Terry Venables. He scored 12 goals in his first season in England as Portsmouth narrowly avoided relegation, bettering that total to 13 in the following campaign.

On 17 December 1998, Aloisi moved to the Premier League with Coventry City, who paid £650,000 for his services. He made his Sky Blues debut in a 1–1 home draw against Derby County, appearing as a late substitute; also coming from the bench, he netted in the next match, 1–1 against Tottenham Hotspur.

Aloisi scored twice in a 4–1 win against Aston Villa at Villa Park, which was Coventry's first ever away victory in the league against their Midlands rivals. Starting in the next game, against Charlton Athletic, he was sent off for punching Danny Mills, receiving a considerable ban.. For Portsmouth and Coventry combined, he finished the season with 18 goals.

Coventry were constantly threatened with relegation during Aloisi's time at the club, and finally went down at the end of the 2000–01 season after a 34-year top flight stay, with Aloisi scoring just three times. He scored a hat-trick against Preston North End in the season's Football League Cup – 4–1 home win, 7–2 on aggregate). In June, he was allowed to leave Highfield Road, and came close to signing for Crystal Palace, but nothing came of it.

Spain
In 2001, Aloisi moved to Spain, joining Pamplona's CA Osasuna. He scored nine goals in 30 games in his first season in La Liga, being regularly used during his four-year spell in Navarre. On 11 April 2004, he played the full 90 minutes in a 3–0 away win against Real Madrid and, on 11 June of the following year, he netted in the Copa del Rey final, equalising in an eventual 1–2 extra time loss against Real Betis.

After a move to Panathinaikos F.C. collapsed, Aloisi signed for another Spanish outfit, Deportivo Alavés, on a free transfer. He scored ten goals in 2005–06, his best Spanish total, but the Basque team suffered top flight relegation.

Return to Australia
On 20 October 2007, it was announced that Aloisi had signed with the Central Coast Mariners FC for the remainder of the season. The team was able to not include his wages in the salary cap due to a loop hole relating to injured players. He made his debut in the A-League on the 28th against Sydney FC, in a 2–3 defeat.

On 3 March 2008, after failing to re-sign with the Mariners, Aloisi penned a two-year deal with Sydney FC, for an undisclosed fee reported to be $1.4 million a season, making him the highest-paid player based in Australia in any of the four football codes. He made his debut as a second-half substitute against Perth Glory FC at the Sydney Football Stadium, and scored his first goal for Sydney in a 2–0 upset win over archrivals Melbourne Victory FC.

On 18 February 2009, 33-year-old Aloisi was linked with a loan move to Shanghai Shenhua F.C. in China. He soon decided against the deal, opting instead to spend the entire pre-season with Sydney FC, under the club's new coach Vítězslav Lavička. He scored twice in a friendly with the Newcastle United Jets FC, and eventually started repaying the faith the team had in him by scoring a double in a 3–2 win against North Queensland Fury FC in Townsville, in the first game of the season; he finished the campaign – winning both the minor and the major championships – as the first Sydney player ever to reach double digits in a single season.

On 29 March 2010, Melbourne Heart FC signed Aloisi on a free transfer. He impressed at the new club and scored eight goals, including three against rivals Melbourne Victory, both the first goal ever in a Melbourne derby, and a brace which equalised the game at 2–2 after the Heart had been 2–0 down. On 12 February 2011, he played the final game of his career against former team Sydney FC, in the last round of the A-League season, scoring and being replaced by in the 83rd minute by Kristian Sarkies, to a standing ovation from the home crowd.

International career

Aloisi made his debut for the Australian national team in 1997. Also in that year, he was selected to the FIFA Confederations Cup, scoring in a 3–1 group stage win against Mexico for the eventual runners-up.

After representing Australia at the 2004 Summer Olympics as one of the three overage players, scoring three goals in an eventual quarterfinal exit, Aloisi finished second in the scoring charts at the 2005 Confederations Cup, netting braces against Germany and Argentina as the Socceroos did not manage one single point in three games.
 
On 16 November 2005, Aloisi scored the decisive penalty against Uruguay in the 2006 FIFA World Cup playoffs, after a 1–1 aggregate tie. That goal meant Australia qualified to the FIFA World Cup for the first time since 1974. He was selected in the squad for the final stages in Germany and, on 12 June, came off the bench to score the third goal in a 3–1 group stage victory against Japan, thus becoming only the second Australian to score a goal at the World Cup finals, after teammate Tim Cahill.

On 21 July 2007, Aloisi scored in the 2007 AFC Asian Cup's quarterfinal match against Japan (1–1), in an eventual penalty shootout exit in Australia's first ever participation in that tournament. It would be the last of his 27 international goals, second-best behind Damian Mori at the time of his retirement.

After his return to the A-League, Aloisi ceased to be recalled by the national team. In early 2008, his penalty kick against Uruguay which took the Socceroos to the 2006 World Cup was voted by the Sport Australia Hall of Fame as one of three greatest moments in Australian sporting history.

Coaching career

Melbourne Heart
After retiring, Aloisi started a coaching career, being appointed youth manager at Melbourne Heart. On 8 May 2012, it was announced that he had accepted a three-year contract to be the manager of Melbourne Heart. On 5 October 2012, he got his first win as manager as Melbourne Heart beat rivals Melbourne Victory 2–1. Aloisi struggled in his first season as head coach, with Melbourne Heart coming ninth in the 2012–13 season and winning only one away game all season. The 2013–14 season did not start any better with the Heart managing 0 wins, 4 draws and 6 losses from 10 starts.  On 28 December 2013, Aloisi was sacked as the manager of Melbourne Heart following the club's seventeenth competitive match without a win.

Melbourne Victory
On 9 February 2015, Aloisi joined Melbourne Victory FC as the development coach of its National Youth League and National Premier League sides.

Brisbane Roar
On 26 May 2015, Aloisi was named manager of Brisbane Roar. In both of his first two seasons at the club, the Roar achieved a top 4 finish in the league, and made it to the semi-finals.

In May 2017, Aloisi signed a new three-year contract to stay on as manager of Brisbane.

On 28 December 2018, Aloisi resigned as manager of Brisbane Roar following the club's poor start to the season, with the Roar second-last on the A-League ladder with just 1 win in 9 matches at the time of his departure. He left as Brisbane Roar's longest serving manager.

Western United
In July 2021, Aloisi was appointed as head coach of Western United, signing a two-year contract.

In May 2022, Aloisi guided Western United to the A-League Championship, with a 2–0 win over defending champions Melbourne City. The championship win saw Western United became just the second expansion side ever to win the A-League Championship, the quickest expansion side to win the championship, the first team since to triumph in their first grand final appearance since Brisbane Roar in 2011, and one of just two teams to have won the championship after finishing outside the top two, with Melbourne Victory first achieving this feat in 2018. Aloisi has been credited for overhauling the club's culture, which saw the club go from 10th place the previous season to champions the next season.

Personal life
Aloisi is of Italian descent through his grandparents, who are from Calabria. His older brother Ross, was also a professional footballer, and has served under him as an assistant coach.

A devout Catholic, Aloisi is married to Angela and has daughters: Alisia, Katia and Amaya.

Aloisi appeared on the cover of the Australian version of Pro Evolution Soccer 6.

In addition to his native English, Aloisi also speaks Italian and Spanish.

In 2020, Aloisi successfully underwent surgery to fix a tear in his mitral valve.

Career statistics

Club

International

Scores and results list Australia's goal tally first.

Managerial statistics

Honours

Player
Club
Adelaide City
NSL championship: 1991–92
Osasuna
Copa del Rey runner-up: 2004–05
Central Coast Mariners
A-League premiership: 2007–08
Sydney FC
A-League premiership: 2009–10
A-League championship: 2010

International
Australia
FIFA Confederations Cup runner-up: 1997
OFC Nations Cup: 2004

Individual
FIFA Confederations Cup Bronze Shoe: 2005

Manager
Western United
A-League championship: 2022

References

External links

 FFA – Socceroo profile
 OzFootball profile
 
 
 

1976 births
Living people
Soccer players from Adelaide
Australian soccer players
Australia youth international soccer players
Australia under-20 international soccer players
Australian people of Italian descent
Association football forwards
National Soccer League (Australia) players
Adelaide City FC players
Belgian Pro League players
Standard Liège players
Royal Antwerp F.C. players
Serie A players
Serie B players
U.S. Cremonese players
Premier League players
English Football League players
Portsmouth F.C. players
Coventry City F.C. players
La Liga players
CA Osasuna players
Deportivo Alavés players
A-League Men players
Central Coast Mariners FC players
Sydney FC players
Melbourne City FC players
Melbourne City FC managers
Australia international soccer players
Australian soccer commentators
Australian television presenters
1997 FIFA Confederations Cup players
2001 FIFA Confederations Cup players
2004 OFC Nations Cup players
2005 FIFA Confederations Cup players
2006 FIFA World Cup players
2007 AFC Asian Cup players
Olympic soccer players of Australia
Footballers at the 2004 Summer Olympics
Australian expatriate soccer players
Expatriate footballers in Belgium
Expatriate footballers in Italy
Expatriate footballers in England
Expatriate footballers in Spain
Australian expatriate sportspeople in Belgium
Australian expatriate sportspeople in Italy
Australian expatriate sportspeople in Spain
Australian expatriate sportspeople in England
Australian Institute of Sport soccer players
A-League Men managers
Marquee players (A-League Men)
Australian soccer coaches
Segunda División players